Elective Affinities is a 1974 East German drama film directed by Siegfried Kühn. It follows the dynamics which follow when a couple invite two other people. The film is based on Johann Wolfgang von Goethe's 1809 novel Elective Affinities. It was released by the DEFA film studio on 27 August 1974.

Cast
 Beata Tyszkiewicz as Charlotte
 Hilmar Thate as Eduard
 Magda Vasary as Ottilie
 Gerry Wolff as the Captain
 Horst Schulze as Mittler
 Christine Schorn as Baroness
 Volkmar Kleinert as Count
 Jana Plichtová as Luciane
 Nico Turoff as gardener
 Jost Braun as architect

Reception
The journal Film-Dienst wrote: "In the historical scenography and in the dialogue, the film misses the issues of the original work; shortenings and tightenings occasionally make the developments incomprehensible. What in Goethe is presented as a clash of moral and natural laws, appears in the film as a questioning of norms, moral and ethics of civil marriage. For literature fans still a remarkable contribution."

References

External links
 

1974 films
1974 drama films
German drama films
East German films
Films based on German novels
Films based on works by Johann Wolfgang von Goethe
Films set in the 1800s
1970s German-language films
1970s German films